The Mamelukes of the Imperial Guard were a cavalry unit that served in Napoleon I’s Imperial Guard during the Napoleonic Wars. Originally made up of Mameluk slave soldiers, the unit eventually was mostly recruited  from a wide mixture of Middle Eastern and European soldiers. Originally only mustering a single squadron, a second squadron would be raised from European cavalrymen in 1813, both squadrons served under the Regiment of Chasseurs a Cheval of the Imperial Guard.  The various spellings of the squadron's title include Mamelukes, Mamluks and Mamelouks.

History 
Napoleon formed his own Mamluk corps, the last known Mamluk force, in the early years of the 19th century, and used Mamluks in a number of his campaigns.  Napoleon's famous bodyguard Roustam Raza was also a Mamluk who had been sold in Egypt.

Throughout the Napoleonic era there was a special Mamluk corps in the French army. In his history of the 13th Chasseurs, Colonel Descaves recounts how Napoleon used the Mamluks during the French campaign in Egypt and Syria.  In the so-called "Instructions" that Bonaparte gave to Jean Baptiste Kléber after departure, Napoleon wrote that he had already bought from Syrian merchants about 2,000 Mamluks with whom he intended to form a special detachment.

On 14 September 1799  Kléber established a mounted company of Mamluk auxiliaries and Syrian Janissaries from Turkish troops captured at the siege of Acre. Menou reorganized the company on 7 July 1800, forming 3 companies of 100 men each and renaming it the "Mamluks de la République". 

In 1801 General Jean Rapp was sent to Marseille to organize a squadron of 250 Mamluks. On 7 January 1802 the previous order was canceled and the squadron reduced to 150 men. The list of effectives on 21 April 1802 reveals 3 officers and 155 other ranks. By decree of 25 December 1804 the Mamluks were organized into a company attached to the Chasseurs-à-Cheval of the Imperial Guard. The officers were Frenchmen, the troopers were a mixture of Syrians, Greeks, Circassains, Crimeans, Armenians Egyptians, Georgians, Arabs and Turks. Individuals came from Albania, Hungary, Malta and Tunisia. Every Mameluk was armed with two brace of pistols, a very curved saber, dagger, mace and eventually a battle-ax. During the remainder of their service the Mamlukes were issued at various dates with carbines, a form of blunderbuss and a musket. These firearms were manufactured by the Manufacturie de Versaillies.

In 1804 the company of Mamelukes had: 9 officers (6 of whom were Arabs), 10 NCOs (6 of whom were Arabs), 10 brigadiers (8 of whom were Arabs), 2 trumpeters and 92 privates.

Mamluks fought well at the Battle of Austerlitz on 2 December 1805, and the regiment was granted a standard and its roster increased to accommodate a standard-bearer and a trumpet. A decree of 15 April 1806 defined the strength of the squadron as 13 officers and 147 privates. A famous painting by Francisco Goya shows a charge of Mamluks against the Madrilene on 2 May 1808 (Dos de Mayo Uprising).

In 1813 the Mameluks were reinforced with Frenchmen who were designated as '2nd Mameluks'. There were 2 companies of Mameluks, the 1st was ranked as Old Guard and the 2nd as Young Guard. The Squadron of Mameluks was attached to the Regiment of Guard Chasseurs. Between 1813 and the following year a total of 205 Frenchmen and 119 recruits from a variety of European countries were added to the original mixture of Manluks and others. 

Despite the decree of 21 March 1815 that stated that no foreigner could be admitted into the Imperial Guard, Napoleon's decree of 24 April prescribed amongst other things that the Chasseurs-à-Cheval of the Imperial Guard included a squadron of two companies of Mamluks for the Belgian Campaign. With the First Restoration, the company of the Mamluks of the Old Guard was incorporated in the Corps Royal des Chasseurs de France. The Mamluks of the Young Guard were incorporated into the 7th Chasseurs-à-Cheval.

Following the Second Bourbon Restoration of 1815 there were widespread reprisals against individuals or groups identified with the defeated Napoleonic regime. These included the small number of Mamluks still in service, eighteen of whom were massacred in Marseilles while awaiting transportation back to Egypt. Since 1806 a depot had been maintained in Marseilles for retired veterans of the squadron and their families.

Mamluk uniform

During their service in Napoleon’s army, the Mamluk squadron wore the following uniform:
Before 1804: The only "uniform" part was the green cahouk (hat), white turban, and red saroual (trousers), all to be worn with a loose shirt and a vest. Boots were of yellow, red, or tan soft leather. Weapons consisted of an "Oriental" scimitar, a brace of pistols in a holder decorated with a brass crescent and star, and a dagger.

After 1804: The cahouk became red with a brass crescent and star, and the shirt was closed and had a collar. The main change was the addition of a "regulation" chasseur-style saddle cloth and roll, imperial green in color, piped red, with a red and white fringe. The saddle and harness remained Arabic in style. The undress uniform was as for the Chasseurs-à-Cheval of the Guard, but of a dark blue cloth.

See also

References

External links
Guard Cavalry of the Napoleonic Wars

Military units and formations established in 1799
Military units and formations disestablished in 1815
1799 establishments in France
1815 disestablishments in France
Regiments of the First French Empire
Foreign regiments in French Service